Theodor Sommerschield (14 November 1924 – 29 November 1986) was a Norwegian competitive sailor. He was born in Oslo. He competed at the 1968 Summer Olympics in Mexico City, in the dragon class, and at the 1972 Summer Olympics in Munich.

References

External links
 

1924 births
1986 deaths
Sportspeople from Oslo
Norwegian male sailors (sport)
Olympic sailors of Norway
Sailors at the 1968 Summer Olympics – Dragon
Sailors at the 1972 Summer Olympics – Dragon